Harold Craig Lewis (July 22, 1944 – January 13, 2013) was an American politician from Pennsylvania who served as a Democratic member of the Pennsylvania State Senate for the 6th district from 1975 to 1994. Lewis was chair of the Judiciary, Local Government, and Ethics Committees throughout his Senate career. He served on numerous state commissions and he was the minority leader of the Appropriations Committee until 1984.

Early life and education
Lewis was born in Hazleton, Pennsylvania, Lewis graduated from Millersville University of Pennsylvania, attended the University of Nebraska graduate school and received his law degree from Temple University.

Career
In 1980, Lewis lost a primary bid for the U.S. Senate.  In 1992, he lost a bid to unseat Republican Auditor General Barbara Hafer.

He practiced law as a partner in the Dechert, Price & Rhodes law firm and served as a member of the Bar of the Supreme Court of Pennsylvania, the Pennsylvania Intergovernmental Council, and the state Advisory Committee for Guidance Service.  After leaving the Senate, Sen. Lewis served as a vice president for corporate affairs at Norfolk Southern Corp. In 1998, he was named chair of the Philadelphia Foundation, which at that time awarded the Philadelphia Liberty Medal.  He also was on the board of Aria Health, which operates three hospitals in the Philadelphia region, and the Philadelphia Zoo.

He died of a heart attack in Loblolly Bay on a vacation to the British Virgin Islands in 2013.  At the time of his death he resided in Philadelphia, Pennsylvania.  He is buried immediately next to Harry Kalas at Laurel Hill Cemetery in Philadelphia.

Personal life
In 1984 he married Dianne Semingson, a Philadelphia business director who served in the Wilson Goode administration as a city representative.

Legacy
In 2013, Norfolk Southern Railway renamed the Dillerville Yard in Lancaster, Pennsylvania in honor of Lewis.

External links
 Senator H. Craig Lewis Papers

References

1944 births
2013 deaths
20th-century American politicians
Burials at Laurel Hill Cemetery (Philadelphia)
Millersville University of Pennsylvania alumni
Pennsylvania lawyers
Democratic Party Pennsylvania state senators
Politicians from Hazleton, Pennsylvania
Temple University Beasley School of Law alumni
20th-century American lawyers